Sing Anyway (French: Chantons quand même) is a 1940 French musical comedy film directed by Pierre Caron and starring Annie Vernay, Paul Cambo and Marie Bizet.

The film's art direction was by Jean Douarinou.

Cast
 Guy Berry
 Marie Bizet as Mathilde  
 Rivers Cadet 
 Paul Cambo as Le sergent Jacques Destranges  
 Raymond Cordy as Pimpant  
 Eugène Frouhins
 Suzy Lay
 Noël Roquevert as Le vieux villageois  
 Claude Roy as Le petit garçon  
 Annie Vernay as Rosette  
 Jack Wilson as Le Tommy

References

Bibliography 
 Crisp, Colin. Genre, Myth and Convention in the French Cinema, 1929-1939. Indiana University Press, 2002.

External links 
 

1940 films
1940 musical comedy films
French musical comedy films
1940s French-language films
Films directed by Pierre Caron
French black-and-white films
1940s French films